Bluff Park is a small, upscale neighborhood in Long Beach, California, United States. There is a bluff along much of the beach in Long Beach, and on one stretch, there is the narrow Bluff Park from which the neighborhood gets its name.

Bluff Park is the location of the Long Beach Museum of Art, as well as many older, well-maintained homes. There is also a Buddhist monastery that once was a Roman Catholic convent.

The boundaries for the Bluff Park Historic District (founded in 1982) are defined as Ocean Boulevard on the south, Junipero Avenue of the west, a jagged line between 2nd St. and Broadway on the north, and Loma Avenue on the east. The community of Belmont Heights is to the east of Bluff Park, the community of Bluff Heights is to the north, and the community of Alamitos Beach is to the west.

Bluff Park

Bluff Park is a  park located between Ocean Blvd. and a tall bluff above the large sandy beach in the area. It is frequented by joggers, strollers, and dog walkers. Hobbyists with radio-controlled gliders like to use the natural updrafts of the bluff for their model planes. There is a replica of the Lone Sailor Statue in the park in honor of Long Beach's Naval heritage.

Historic buildings and homes
The historic district includes a variety of architectural styles, including Greene and Greene, American Craftsman, California Bungalow, Spanish Revival, Prairie Style, American Colonial Revival, Tudor and Mediterranean from the early 1900s.
 The Heartwell/Lowe House, 1919, 2505 East 2nd St., Colonial Revival (just outside the Bluff Park Historic District) 
 Long Beach Museum of Art (the Elizabeth Milbank Anderson house and carriage house), 1912, 2300 East Ocean Blvd., Craftsman Bungalow
 Long Beach Monastery, 3361 E. Ocean Blvd., (affiliation: Mahayana, Ch'an (Zen), Dharma Realm Buddhist Association)
 Irving Gill house, 2749 E. Ocean Boulevard
 Weathering Heights
 Roland Swaffield house, architecture by L. Milton Wolf
 La Villa de la Luna, built 1923
 Southwind House, built for Dr. A.C. Sellery, co-founder of Seaside Hospital; designed by William Horace Austin, 1913
 Beans Reardon House
 Clarence J. Smale
 Roland Coate
 Meyer & Holler

Gallery

See also
Neighborhoods of Long Beach, California

References

External links
Bluff Park Historic District
 
 

Neighborhoods in Long Beach, California
Tourist attractions in Long Beach, California
Parks in Los Angeles County, California